I Believe in a Thing Called Love is the debut extended play (EP) by English rock band The Darkness. Released on 12 August 2002 by Must Destroy, the EP features three tracks which would later appear on the band's debut full-length album Permission to Land in 2003, including UK top-ten singles "I Believe in a Thing Called Love" and "Love Is Only a Feeling".

Track listing
All tracks written and composed by Justin Hawkins, Dan Hawkins, Frankie Poullain and Ed Graham.
"I Believe in a Thing Called Love"
"Love on the Rocks with No Ice"
"Love Is Only a Feeling"

Personnel
Justin Hawkins – vocals, guitar, synth
Dan Hawkins – guitar
Frankie Poullain – bass
Ed Graham – drums

References

2002 debut EPs
The Darkness (band) albums